An autocrat is the ruler of an autocracy, but the term may also refer to:

 Autokrator, a Greek epithet applied to an individual who exercises absolute power, unrestrained by superiors
 Auster Autocrat, a 1940s British single-engined three-seat high-wing touring monoplane
 Autocrat, LLC, a company based in Rhode Island, United States
 The Autocrat of the Breakfast-Table, a collection of essays written by Oliver Wendell Holmes, Sr.
 The Autocrats, a Finnish political satire TV series